The 2020 PDC Women's Series consists of 4 darts tournaments on the 2020 PDC Pro Tour.

With the British Darts Organisation on the brink of being dissolved, the Professional Darts Corporation decided to introduce a new PDC Women's Series, which would also replace the Women's Qualifiers for the PDC World Darts Championship.

The top 2 ranked women would qualify for the 2021 PDC World Darts Championship.

Prize money
The prize fund for each of the Women's Series events was £5,000, with £1,000 going to the winner.

This is how the prize money is divided:

Results

Women's Series 1
Women's Series 1 was contested on Saturday 17 October 2020 at the Barnsley Metrodome in Barnsley.

Women's Series 2
Women's Series 2 was contested on Saturday 17 October 2020 at the Barnsley Metrodome in Barnsley.

Women's Series 3
Women's Series 3 was contested on Sunday 18 October 2020 at the Barnsley Metrodome in Barnsley.

Women's Series 4
Women's Series 4 was contested on Sunday 18 October 2020 at the Barnsley Metrodome in Barnsley.

References

2020 in darts
2020 PDC Pro Tour